East Fife may refer to:

 The Eastern part of Fife, a council area in Scotland
 East Fife F.C., a men's association football team
 East Fife G.W.F.C., a women's association football team
 East Fife (UK Parliament constituency), 1885–1983